Manny is a 2011 South Korean romantic comedy television series, starring Seo Ji-seok, Choi Jung-yoon, Byun Jung-soo, Jung Da-bin and Goo Seung-hyun. It aired on tvN from April 13 to June 2, 2011 for 16 episodes.

Synopsis
Kim Yi-han (Seo Ji-seok) is a manny, a male nanny, from New York. Due to some mishaps, he has to find work in South Korea while he is stuck there for a while. Seo Do-young (Choi Jung-yoon) is the divorced mother of Oh Eun-bi (Jung Da-bin) and Oh Jung-min (Goo Seung-hyun). Her children's antics have scared away all former nannies. She works in the fashion industry, living under her elder sister Janice (Byun Jung-soo)'s iron rule. Janice is the somewhat self-centered head of her own modelling agency, pushing herself and all her connections in competing in the field. Circumstances bring them together, and the result is sometimes funny, sometimes serious, and all-round interesting to watch.

Cast
 Seo Ji-seok as Kim Yi-han
 Choi Jung-yoon as Seo Do-young
 Byun Jung-soo as Janice
 Jung Da-bin as Oh Eun-bi
 Goo Seung-hyun as Oh Jung-min
 Kim Sook as Goo Hyun-jung
 Seo Woo-jin as Lee Joon-ki
 Park Joon-hyuk as Eun-bi and Jung-min's father
 Jin Seo-yeon as Shin Gi-roo
 Kim Young as Sang-chul
 Park Hyuk-kwon
 Rottyful Sky as Byun Jang-soo (guest, episode 5)
 Lee Dong-ha as Lee Seung-gi

References

External links
 Manny official tvN website 
 
 

2011 South Korean television series debuts
2011 South Korean television series endings
Korean-language television shows
TVN (South Korean TV channel) television dramas
South Korean romance television series
South Korean comedy television series